The Sins of Rachel Cade is a 1961 drama film directed by Gordon Douglas and starring Angie Dickinson in the title role as well as Peter Finch and Roger Moore.

Plot
During World War II, Protestant medical missionary Rachel comes to the village of Dibela in the Belgian Congo. Widowed military administrator Colonel Derode is initially skeptical about her work, but eventually is romantically attracted to Rachel. One of her patients is Paul Wilton, an American doctor with the Royal Air Force (RAF). She makes love with Paul the night before he is to leave, and becomes pregnant.

Cast
 Angie Dickinson as Rachel Cade
 Peter Finch as Colonel Henry Derode
 Roger Moore as Paul Wilton
 Errol John as Kulu
 Woody Strode as Muwango
 Juano Hernández as Kalanumu
 Frederick O'Neal as Buderga
 Mary Wickes as Marie Grieux
 Scatman Crothers as Musinga
 Rafer Johnson as Kosongo
 Charles Wood as Mzimba
 Douglas Spencer as Doctor Bikel

Background
The film is loosely based on the 1956 novel by Charles Mercer, Rachel Cade, published by G. P. Putnam's Sons.

Film rights were bought prior to publication by William Dozier who was head of production at RKO. In September 1956 he announced that Stanley Rubin would produce and the film would be made in Africa with John Wayne. It would be part of a five-picture slate from Rubin worth $12 million starting with The Girl Most Likely. Katharine Hepburn was announced as a possible star. Then Dozier offered the lead to Deborah Kerr. Stirling Silliphant signed to write the script. In October Dozier said the film would be one of fifteen RKO would make the following year, others including Stage Struck, Bangkok, Ten Days in August, Three Empty Rooms, Affair in Portifino, Sex and Miss McAdoo, Pakistan, Galveston, On My Honor, The Naked and the Dead, Cash MCad, Far Alert, Journey to the Center of the Earth and Curtain Going Up.

RKO wound up as a company – most of the fifteen films listed were not made. Film rights went to Warner Bros who in November 1958 announced they would make the film. In March 1959 Edward Anhalt was assigned to write the script and Henry Blanke was to produce. Blanke had also produced The Nun's Story (1959), starring Audrey Hepburn. The Sins of Rachel Cade had some familiarities to that story particularly with the lead character: a religious female working to help during wartime. Also, Peter Finch plays an atheistic authority figure in both films.

In June Warners announced that Carroll Baker would star and Gordon Douglas would direct. Peter Finch was announced as the male star. However Baker refused to make the movie and Warners gave the lead to Angie Dickinson, who had just made Rio Bravo and The Bramble Bush for the studio.

In August Peter Finch arrived in Hollywood for filming, which began August 27. He called his role "a good, rather cynical part with some excellent dialogue." Rafer Johnson signed in September. Roger Moore's casting was announced in October – he was then making The Alaskans for Warner Bros.

Notes

External links
 
 

1961 films
Warner Bros. films
1961 drama films
American drama films
Films set in the 1940s
Films set in Belgian Congo
Films set in the Democratic Republic of the Congo
Films based on American novels
Films directed by Gordon Douglas
Films scored by Max Steiner
Films with screenplays by Edward Anhalt
1960s English-language films
1960s American films